Tlaleng Mofokeng is a South African physician who is the United Nations' Special Rapporteur on the Right to Health. She campaigns for universal health access and HIV care. She was named as one of the BBC's 100 Women in 2021.

Early life and education 
Mofokeng was born in QwaQwa. She was an undergraduate student at the University of KwaZulu-Natal Nelson R. Mandela School of Medicine. She graduated in 2007, and worked as a medical doctor in the Gauteng Health Department. She worked as a paediatrician at the Charlotte Maxeke Johannesburg Academic Hospital and the West Rand clinics, as well as overseeing various health services.

Career 
Mofokeng worked at Higher Education and Training HIV/AIDS Program (HEAIDS) on an educational video series to mitigate HIV in South Africa. She also presented medical documentaries for Al Jazeera. In 2015, Mofokeng joined International SOS, where she was responsible for medical care in Johannesburg. In this capacity, she served as Chair of the Sexual and Reproductive Justice Coalition of South Africa.

Mofokeng has focused on gender equality, neonatal health and the management of HIV. She was made country lead of Global Doctors for Choice in 2017 and Commissioner for Gender Equality in 2019. She has taken on domestic violence in court, making use of the Committee on the Elimination of Discrimination against Women.

In 2020, Mofokeng was appointed United Nations Special Rapporteur on the Right to Health. She is the first woman and first African to hold this position. She was appointed to the board of directors of the International Partnership for Microbicides in 2021, and serves as Distinguished Lecturer at Georgetown University. 

Mofokeng usually goes under the title "Dr T". Her first book, Dr T: A Guide to Sexual Health and Pleasure, was published by Picador in 2021. The Sunday Sun described how "the magic is contained in its warm, motherly, vulnerable and non-judgmental delivery". She is leading the delivery of Sentable, a mobile app that supports the physical and mental wellbeing of young people in African impacted by HIV.

Mofokeng is an advocate for universal health access and adolescent health. She serves as an advisor of the United Nations University International Institute for Global Health Gender & Health Hub.

Other activities 
 Bill & Melinda Gates Foundation, Member of the Advisory Group of the Goalkeepers Initiative (since 2022)

Awards and honours 
 2016: Mail & Guardian One of the top 200 Young South Africans
 2016: Bill and Melinda Gates Foundation 120 Under 40 Leader
 2017: Africa Youth Awards Most Influential Young Africans
 2018: Aspen Institute New Voices Senior Fellow
 2021: BBC 100 Women

References

External links 
 

Living people
21st-century South African physicians
South African women physicians
South African physicians
21st-century women physicians
University of KwaZulu-Natal alumni
BBC 100 Women
Year of birth missing (living people)